The former First Church of Christ, Scientist, located at 2704 Monroe Street, in Toledo, Ohio, is an historic building built in 1898.  It was added to the National Register of Historic Places in 1978, at which date the building was Universal Community Church. 
First Church of Christ, Scientist, Toledo, now holds services at 4647 West Central Avenue at Corey Road in Ottawa Hills.

See also
List of Registered Historic Places in Ohio
List of former Christian Science churches, societies and buildings
 First Church of Christ, Scientist (disambiguation)

References

External links
 National Register listings for Lucas County, Ohio
 First Church of Christ, Scientist, Toledo website
 Women of History: Sarah Jane Clark (involved in founding the church)

Churches on the National Register of Historic Places in Ohio
National Register of Historic Places in Lucas County, Ohio
Former Christian Science churches, societies and buildings in Ohio
Churches in Toledo, Ohio
Yost and Packard buildings